Zaw Myint Maung is a Burmese politician, physician and former political prisoner who currently serves as Chief Minister of Mandalay Region and Mandalay Region MP for Amarapura Township.

Early life and education
Zaw Myint Maung graduated with a medical degree from the Institute of Medicine, Mandalay in 1979. During his medical career, he worked in Sagaing Division's Yuthitgyi Hospital and served as a demonstrator of biochemistry department at the University of Medicine, Mandalay, formerly known as the Institute of Medicine, Mandalay from 1983 to 1988.

Political career 
In the 1990 Burmese general election, he was elected as a Pyithu Hluttaw MP, winning a majority of 21,119 (66% of the votes), but was never allowed to assume his seat.

On 22 November 1990, he was arrested under Article 122 of the Myanmar Penal Code and sentenced to 25 years, for attending meetings on forming a provisional government. In March 1996, he was sentenced to a further seven years under the 1950 Emergency Provision Act, for publishing a magazine celebrating the 75th anniversary of Rangoon University and another called New Blood Wave. In total, he served a 19-year sentence at a prison in Myitkyina. He was released on 21 February 2009. He is the vice-president of NLD and current acting president of the party.

In the wake of the 2021 Myanmar coup d'état on 1 February, Zaw Myint Maung was detained by the Myanmar Armed Forces. Authorities have charged him with violating COVID restrictions, corruption, and incitement. Zaw Myint Maung is incarcerated at Obo Prison in Mandalay, and was diagnosed with leukemia in 2019.

References

External links
on Facebook

1951 births
Burmese physicians
Living people
Members of Pyithu Hluttaw
National League for Democracy politicians
Prisoners and detainees of Myanmar
University of Medicine, Mandalay alumni
People from Mandalay
Region or state chief ministers of Myanmar